THE One Total Home Experience, stylized THE One, is a furniture retail company founded by a Swedish entrepreneur and philanthropist Thomas Lundgren. Today, THE One has a total of 33 stores and 1 Bistro Restaurant across the Middle East and North Africa, with a total staff complement of over 560.

History
THE One store opened in Abu Dhabi, United Arab Emirates, in 1996. In an interview with Arabian Business magazine, Lundgren says he was inspired by a dream he had in 1993, in which an angel came to him with a mission to save the world from IKEA.

In 2006, THE One celebrated its 10th anniversary by being the sole sponsor of Robbie Williams’ Dubai concert, while also decorating Robbie’s backstage rooms at the Nad Al Sheba venue.

In April 2007, THE One was named one of the GCC’s 50 Most Admired Companies by Arabian Business magazine.  In 2011, THE One launched its Fusion brand, which competes with high-end furniture retailers. In 2012, THE One Junior launched and offers children’s furniture.

THE One aims to operate 99 stores by 2020.

Concept

According to CEO, Thomas Lundgren, THE One's creative concept is to be magical and meaningful and "mass market, but to be prestigious with affordable prices". Lundgren claims to sell feelings rather than commodities and calls THE One stores "theatres", where seasonal home fashion shows are staged. Each "theatre" set up by a team of decorators. The larger stores are furniture-driven with accessories complementing it and the smaller stores, or "Boutique Theatres", are accessory-driven with furniture incorporated to enhance the accessories.

Many stores include in-store restaurants.

References

Companies based in Dubai
Retail companies of the United Arab Emirates
Emirati companies established in 1996
Retail companies established in 1996
Furniture retailers